Coenosia elegans is a species of fly in the genus Coenosia. It is found in Alaska (USA).

References

External links 
 Coenosia elegans at insectoid.info

Muscidae
Insects described in 1965
Fauna of Alaska
Endemic fauna of Alaska